Eurychorda is a group of plants in the Restionaceae described as a genus in 1998. There is  only one known species, Eurychorda complanata, endemic to Australia (Tasmania, Victoria, New South Wales and Queensland).

References

Restionaceae
Monotypic Poales genera
Endemic flora of Australia
Taxa named by Barbara G. Briggs
Taxa named by Lawrence Alexander Sidney Johnson
Taxa described in 1998